Shahnoor is a Bangladeshi actress and model who acted jn films and television dramas and became model in TVCs. Her most notable works include Hajar Bachhor Dhore, Sahoshi Manush Chai, Swapner Bashor, Noyon Vora Jol.

Biography
Syeda Kamrun Naher Shahnoor began her journey in Dhallywood with Fasir Adesh. This film was an unreleased film. Her first released film was Jiddi Sontan which was released in 2000. Rubel was her co-star in that film. She acted in Sahoshi Manush Chai and Karagar in 2003. Sahoshi Manush Chai won National Film Award in two categories and Karagar won National Film Award in one category. She acted in Hajar Bachhor Dhore in 2005. This film won National Film Award in five categories including Best Film. Opohoron was her last released film. Shahnoor later starred in 'Kakatadua', an official grant to a liberation war story directed by Farooq Hossain. She is currently involved in the politics of Bangladesh Awami League and she is the Film Affairs Secretary of Bangabandhu Sangskritik Jote.

Filmography

Films

Web series and drama

Director 
This is the first time in a long acting career that actress Shahnoor has started directing. In his own story, thoughts, he made the short film 'Ekti Bangladesh'. Shahnoor also starred in the production side. And his co-star is Arman Pervez Murad. The short story revolves around Bangabandhu. She is working on making a documentary about his freedom fighter father.

Jury board 
The OIC (Organization of Islamic Cooperation) had constituted a 3-member jury board for the final round to implement the Dhaka OIC Youth Capital Film Award 2020–2021. The board consisted of a secretary (convenor) of the Ministry of Information, a teacher at Dhaka University and actress Shahnoor of Bangladesh cinema.

References

Living people
Bangladeshi film actresses
Bangladeshi female models
Bangladeshi television actresses
Year of birth missing (living people)